Sitora Shokhinovna Alieva – film expert, director of the IFF “Faces of love” and the IIF Sochi, artistic director of the largest Russian national film festival “Kinotavr”, official delegate of Warsaw International Film Festival, lecturer at film schools and universities, juror at numerous film festivals, including Berlinale, Venice Film Festival, etc. Member of European Film Academy.

Biography

Sitora Alieva was born in 1963 in Dushanbe, Tajik SSR. She made her film debut as an actress at the age of 7. In the following 9 years she had played about ten roles in different art and television films. In 1987 Alieva graduated from the scriptwriting and film history department (Evgeniy Surkov's class) of the Gerasimov Institute of Cinematography (VGIK) in Moscow. Then she worked for Tajikfilm in Dushanbe and in 1991 promoted Tajik films at different venues around the world including Moscow International Film Festival.

In 1991 she moved to Moscow and then began to work as Daniil Dondurey's, "Iskusstvo Kino" editor-in-chief, referent (1993-1996). In 1993 she began to work at “Kinotavr” conglomerate ran by Mark Rudinstein, and in 1999 became the director of its festival branches: IFF Sochi, IFF “Faces of Love” and the International Children's Arts Festival “Kinotavrik” (1999-2005).

In 2005, after the “Kinotavr” brand was bought by Alexander Rodnyansky, only Russian part of the festival was left, IIF Sochi and IFF “Faces of Love” were stopped. Alieva has become the permanent artistic director of the Open Russian Film Festival “Kinotavr” – the largest national film festival of the country for now (the edition of Kinotavr-2022 is cancelled).

Also, as a film expert and a festival professional, she lectures in Russia and abroad.

Since 90-s Alieva has been taking part in juries of numerous international, national, the CIS and the Baltics, student and short film festivals, including:
 2002 - Hyderabad International Film Festival
 2005 - Tallinn Black Nights Film Festival
 2006 - Mar del Plata International Film Festival
 2006 - European Film Festival Palic
 2006 - Cottbus Festival of Eastern European Cinema
 2007 - 57th Berlin International Film Festival
 2007 - 22nd Mar del Plata International Film Festival
 2007 - Zurich Film Festival
 2007 - Artfilm 
 2008 - 13th International Film Festival of Kerala
 2009 - 66th Venice International Film Festival
 2009 - Reykjavík International Film Festival
 2010 - F5 Short Film Festival 
 2011 - Filmfest München
 2011 - 46th Karlovy Vary International Film Festival
 2011 - 27th Warsaw Film Festival
 2011 - 52nd Thessaloniki International Film Festival
 2012 - LET’S CEE Film Festival 
 2012 - 9th Golden Apricot International Film Festival
 2012 - Batumi International Art-House Film Festival 
 2013 - Minsk International Film Festival “Listapad”
 2013 - 2morrow/Завтра Film Festival 
 2013 - Scanorama European Film Forum
 2014 - VIII Andrey Tarkovsky International Film Festival Zerkalo (Zerkalo Film Festival)
 2015 - Sofia International Film Festival
 2016 - "Slovo" Award
 2017 - Reykjavík International Film Festival
 2018 - El Gouna Film Festival
 2018 - 2nd Pingyao Crouching Tiger Hidden Dragon International Film Festival.
 2020 - Golden Raven Arctic International Film Festival
 2020 - Pacific Meridian International Film Festival of Asian Pacific Countries
 2021 - Warsaw International Film Festival

In 2007-2010 Sitora Alieva had been Russia's official delegate of the Rome International Film Festival.

Strating from 2007 - official delegate of the Warsaw International Film Festival.

Having such an active international festival life, being part of an extensive international festival network and the main national film festival selector at the same time make Sitora one of the key figures in promoting new Russian cinema at the international film festival scene.

References

External links
 Sitora Alieva at Kinotavr film festival official website
 Sitora Alieva on Andrey Zvyagintsev for The New York Times, The New York Times
 Love letters to Hitchcock: film experts’ video interviews at the «Hitchcock 9» film festival, British Council in Russia
 Fifteen Realities of Russian Cinema (Kinotavr 2012), KinoKultura''

Gerasimov Institute of Cinematography alumni
Artistic directors
Film festival directors
1963 births
Living people